Great Freedom is a 2021 drama film directed by . In June 2021, the film was selected to compete in the Un Certain Regard section at the 2021 Cannes Film Festival. At Cannes, the film won the Jury Prize in the Un Certain Regard section. It won the Golden Giraldillo at the Seville European Film Festival. It was selected as the Austrian entry for the Best International Feature Film at the 94th Academy Awards, and on 22 December 2021, it was shortlisted for the award ceremony.

The film was released theatrically on 18 November 2021 in Germany by Piffl Medien and the following day in Austria by Filmladen Filmverleih.

Plot
In post-World War II Germany, Hans is imprisoned for being gay and develops a relationship with his cellmate Viktor, a convicted murderer.

Cast
 Franz Rogowski as Hans Hoffmann
 Georg Friedrich as Viktor Kohl
  as Leo
  as Oskar

Reception

Critical reception
On the review aggregator website Rotten Tomatoes, the film holds an approval rating of 97% based on 60 reviews from critics, with an average rating of 8.1/10. The site's critical consensus reads, "With intelligence and sensitivity, Great Freedom draws on past injustices to present a beautifully crafted tribute to the persistence of the human spirit" On Metacritic, the film has a weighted average score of 89 out of 100, based on 18 reviews, indicating "universal acclaim".

Awards and nominations

See also
 Paragraph 175
 Paragraph 175 (film)
 List of submissions to the 94th Academy Awards for Best International Feature Film
 List of Austrian submissions for the Academy Award for Best International Feature Film

References

External links
 

2021 films
2021 drama films
2021 LGBT-related films
2020s German-language films
Austrian drama films
Austrian LGBT-related films
Films set in the 1940s
Films set in the 1950s
Films set in the 1960s
Films set in prison
Gay-related films
German drama films
German LGBT-related films
LGBT-related drama films
2020s German films
Films set in West Germany